VINE Transit  is a public transportation service in Napa County, California, United States; it is managed under the Napa Valley Transportation Authority and operated by Transdev. The system offers extensive service throughout the county along with providing connections to other public transportation systems in adjacent counties.

Service coverage 
The Napa VINE provides services to the following cities, towns, and communities:

Napa County:
 American Canyon
 Napa
 Yountville
 St. Helena
 Calistoga

Solano County:
 Vallejo
 Fairfield
 Suisun

Contra Costa County:
 El Cerrito

Schedules 
All Napa VINE services do not operate on the following holidays:

 New Year's Day
 Memorial Day
 Independence Day (July 4)
 Labor Day
 Thanksgiving
 Christmas
 Christmas Eve and New Year's Eve, if it falls on a Sunday

However, these services operate on Saturday schedules on other holidays, including:

 President's Day
 Day after Thanksgiving
 Christmas Eve
 New Year's Eve

On other holidays, (i.e. Columbus Day, Veterans Day), trips operate on normal weekday schedules.

Fleet and livery 

The VINE Transit branded fleet is made of the following types of coaches:

Active

Discontinued 
 General Motors Corporation RTS-03 (phased out in early 2013)
 Orion International Orion V 40'
 New Flyer Industries Diesel-electric hybrid 35' Restyled low-floor (DE35LFR) and Diesel-electric 40' low-floor (DE40LF)

Newer buses are grey colored with the current VINE logo displayed along the middle of the bus. Most buses are painted white with the previous VINE logo printed on the side of the bus. However, the DE40LF buses offer artwork promoting VINE's environmentally friendly features; these buses were also wrapped to promote the Spare the Air program. In addition, a number of Gillig Phantom buses exclusive to Route 21 are wrapped in advertising promoting that route. Previously, the livery was simply a green bordered red horizontal stripe with "City of Napa" written near the front in white letters.

VINE Go and the Calistoga Shuttle uses Ford-based ElDorado National Aerolite cutaways.

The Yountville Trolley features a Hometown Trolley Mainstreet tourist trolley that is painted green on red.

Routes 
VINE Transit in Napa County currently operates a hybrid fixed-route and on-demand system in the City of Napa and five regional routes which provides connections between other bus systems and BART and Amtrak. Express routes are subject to additional fares.

Shuttle brands 
VINE manages and operates a number of deviated fixed-route or dial-a-ride bus services in other cities and towns in the county using different brand names.
 American Canyon Transit (ACT) is a deviated fixed-route service in American Canyon that operates two routes; one for peak service and another for normal service. ACT connects with SolTrans Route 1, and VINE Routes 11 and 29.
 Calistoga Shuttle is an on-demand dial-a-ride service that operates within Calistoga. It connects to VINE Route 10
 St. Helena Shuttle is an on-demand dial-a-ride service that operates a route within the city of St. Helena. It connects to VINE Route 10.
 Yountville Trolley is a deviated fixed route service that operates a north-south route in the city of Yountville. It connects to VINE Route 10.

Fares, transfers, and passes 
To board a VINE bus, a passenger must either present a pass, Clipper Card, transfer slip or pay a cash fare. VINE offers discount passes in 31-day and 20-ride formats. A 31-day pass offers unlimited rides for 31 consecutive days from the first day of use on regular routes (1 through 25); there are two separate types of 31-day passes for Route 29. For 20-ride passes, one use is used to board a regular bus, while uses differ on Routes 29 and 21. Transfer slips are issued to passengers who pay cash fare or use punch passes. They are used to transfer from one regular route to another without the need to pay an additional fare or punch; however a transfer is not valid between Routes 10 and 11. They can be used on express buses for an additional charge. Since 2014, Clipper Cards are accepted and various 31-day passes can be loaded onto the card. If nothing is presented, a cash fare must be paid.

References

External links 

 

Bus transportation in California
Public transportation in Napa County, California
Public transportation in Sonoma County, California
Public transportation in Solano County, California
St. Helena, California
Yountville, California
Transdev
1998 establishments in California